The crested tit-warbler (Leptopoecile elegans) is a species of bird in the family Aegithalidae. It is found in China and possibly India. Its natural habitat is boreal forest. It generally has a red hint to it and a bit of blue on, or near, its wings. The tail is of an emerald green colour.

This species is considered monotypic, although it was previously divided into two subspecies: the type subspecies and the subspecies meissneri, which was lumped with elegans in 2022.

References

crested tit-warbler
Birds of China
Birds of Tibet
crested tit-warbler
Taxonomy articles created by Polbot